Thomas Patrick Edens (born June 9, 1961) is an American former professional baseball pitcher who played in Major League Baseball (MLB) for the  New York Mets, Milwaukee Brewers, Minnesota Twins (–), Houston Astros (–), Philadelphia Phillies (1994), and Chicago Cubs.

Edens was drafted in the 14th round (361st overall) by the Kansas City Royals in the 1983 Major League Baseball draft. Late in  Spring Training, he was traded to the New York Mets for Tucker Ashford. Over the next three-plus seasons, Edens worked his way up through their Minor League Baseball (MiLB) farm system. Eventually, he received the call to join the parent club, making his MLB debut with the visiting Mets on June 2, 1987, against the Los Angeles Dodgers. Edens pitched five innings, allowing eight hits and three earned runs, while striking out three and yielding two bases on balls — all of which resulted in a no-decision. (The Mets would eventually lose the game as a result of a three-run Dodgers rally, in the bottom of the eighth inning — against veteran left-handed relief pitcher Jesse Orosco.)

Pitching for the 1992 Minnesota Twins, Edens posted a 2.83 earned run average (ERA), with three saves, and a 6–3 win–loss record, appearing in 52 games.

References

External links

Tom Edens at The Baseball Gauge
Tom Edens at Pura Pelota (Venezuelan Professional Baseball League)
Tom Edens at The Trading Card Database

1961 births
Living people
Baseball players from Oregon
Butte Copper Kings players
Chicago Cubs players
Columbia Mets players
Denver Zephyrs players
Houston Astros players
Iowa Cubs players
Jackson Mets players
Leones del Caracas players
American expatriate baseball players in Venezuela
Lewis–Clark State Warriors baseball players
Lynchburg Mets players
Major League Baseball pitchers
Milwaukee Brewers players
Minnesota Twins players
New York Mets players
Osceola Astros players
People from Ontario, Oregon
Philadelphia Phillies players
Portland Beavers players
Rochester Red Wings players
Scranton/Wilkes-Barre Red Barons players
Tidewater Tides players
Tucson Toros players
Mat-Su Miners players